Dan Tore Evensen (born June 1, 1974 in Arendal) is a Norwegian mixed martial artist and former K-1 Kickboxer. Evensen has fought for the Ultimate Fighting Championship, Bellator Fighting Championships, and the now defunct BodogFIGHT.

Background 
He was a promising hammer thrower, and at 16 he had a personal record at 52.50 meters. He also did boxing and American football, playing for the local team Arendal Wildcats for several years. He was taken out to participate on the Norwegian National American football team in the 90's. As a junior in 1994 he was a Norwegian team-champion in judo. He left Norway to attend the University of Texas at El Paso, Texas, and extended his hammer throw to over 60 meters, with the 2000 Summer Olympics as a goal. He went back to Norway and was working as a ship mechanic, but decided to give the United States another try, this time as a martial artist.

He has a purple belt in Brazilian Jiu-Jitsu (US). He is a former Gladiator Challenge Heavyweight Champion.

Mixed martial arts record

|-
| Win
|align=center| 11–4
| Raoul Romero
| TKO (punches)
| Bellator 5
| 
|align=center| 2
|align=center| 1:43
| Dayton, Ohio, United States
|
|-
| Loss
|align=center| 10–4
| Pat Barry
| TKO (leg kicks)
| UFC 92
| 
|align=center| 1
|align=center| 2:36
| Las Vegas, Nevada, United States
|
|-
| Loss
|align=center| 10–3
| Cheick Kongo
| TKO (punches)
| UFC 87
| 
|align=center| 1
|align=center| 4:55
| Minneapolis, Minnesota, United States
|
|-
| Win
|align=center| 10–2
| Konstantin Gluhov
| Decision (unanimous)
| BodogFIGHT: USA vs. Russia
| 
|align=center| 3
|align=center| 5:00
| Moscow, Russia
|
|-
| Win
|align=center| 9–2
| John George
| TKO (punches)
| IFO: Kimmons vs Yunker
| 
|align=center| 1
|align=center| 0:54
| Nevada, United States
|
|-
| Win
|align=center| 8–2
| Dominic Richard
| TKO (punches)
| BodogFIGHT: Vancouver
| 
|align=center| 1
|align=center| 0:46
| British Columbia, Canada
|
|-
| Win
|align=center| 7–2
| Jeremiah Constant
| TKO (punches)
| BodogFIGHT: Costa Rica
| 
|align=center| 1
|align=center| 1:26
| Costa Rica
|
|-
| Loss
|align=center| 6–2
| Dan Bobish
| Submission (punches)
| Xtreme Fight Series 2
| 
|align=center| 1
|align=center| 1:25
| Idaho, United States
|
|-
| Loss
|align=center| 6–1
| Christian Wellisch
| TKO (corner stoppage)
| IFC: Caged Combat
| 
|align=center| 2
|align=center| 5:00
| California, United States
|
|-
| Win
|align=center| 6–0
| Rob Wince
| TKO (corner stoppage)
| WEF: Sin City
| 
|align=center| 1
|align=center| 5:00
| Nevada, United States
|
|-
| Win
|align=center| 5–0
| Ruben Villareal
| KO (punches)
| GC 32: King of the Hill
| 
|align=center| 2
|align=center| 1:38
| California, United States
|
|-
| Win
|align=center| 4–0
| Julius Askew
| Decision (unanimous)
| GC 27: FightFest 2
| 
|align=center| 3
|align=center| 5:00
| California, United States
|
|-
| Win
|align=center| 3–0
| Mike Wolmack
| TKO (punches)
| GC 27: FightFest 2
| 
|align=center| 1
|align=center| 2:57
| California, United States
|
|-
| Win
|align=center| 2–0
| Jonah Broad
| Submission (rear–naked choke)
| GC 26: FightFest 1
| 
|align=center| 1
|align=center| 0:51
| California, United States
|
|-
| Win
|align=center| 1–0
| Scott Wallace
| N/A
| RMS 2: Rocky Mountain Slammer 2
| 
|align=center| N/A
|align=center| N/A
| Colorado, United States
|

Kickboxing record

References

External links

 

Living people
1974 births
Norwegian male mixed martial artists
Heavyweight mixed martial artists
Mixed martial artists utilizing kickboxing
Mixed martial artists utilizing judo
Mixed martial artists utilizing Brazilian jiu-jitsu
Norwegian male kickboxers
Heavyweight kickboxers
Norwegian practitioners of Brazilian jiu-jitsu
Norwegian male judoka
People from Arendal
Norwegian players of American football
University of Texas at El Paso alumni
Ultimate Fighting Championship male fighters
Sportspeople from Agder